Shushabad (also Romanized as Shūshābād and Sūshābād) is a village in Tarand Rural District, Jalilabad District, Pishva County, Tehran Province, Iran. At the 2006 census, its population was 1,037, in 223 families.

References 

Populated places in Pishva County